Matti Pesonen (1 August 1868 - 11 December 1957) was a Finnish educationist and politician. He was born in Sääminki. He was a member of the Parliament of Finland, representing the Young Finnish Party from 1907 to 1908 and the National Coalition Party from 1922 to 1924.

References

1868 births
1957 deaths
People from Savonlinna
People from Mikkeli Province (Grand Duchy of Finland)
Finnish Lutherans
Young Finnish Party politicians
National Coalition Party politicians
Members of the Parliament of Finland (1907–08)
Members of the Parliament of Finland (1922–24)
University of Helsinki alumni